Double JJ Resort Ranch Airport  was a privately owned, public use airport located two nautical miles (4 km) northwest of the central business district of Rothbury, in Oceana County, Michigan, United States.

The airport is closed, but  Double JJ Resort continues to operate.

Facilities and aircraft 
Double JJ Resort Ranch Airport covered an area of 90 acres (36 ha) at an elevation of 689 feet (210 m) above mean sea level. It had one runway designated 9/27 with a turf surface measuring 3,600 by 100 feet (1,097 x 30 m). For the 12-month period ending December 31, 2006, the airport had 274 general aviation aircraft operations, an average of 22 per month.

References

External links 
 Aerial image as of March 1999 from USGS The National Map

Airports in Michigan
Defunct airports in Michigan
Transportation in Oceana County, Michigan